K. David Harris (July 29, 1927 – June 27, 2010) was a justice of the Iowa Supreme Court from January 11, 1972, to July 29, 1999, appointed from Greene County, Iowa.

Born in Jefferson, Iowa, Harris graduated from Jefferson High School in 1945 and immediately entered the United States Army, serving in the 7th Infantry Division in the Pacific Theatre of World War II. He received a bachelor's degree from the University of Iowa in 1949, and a law degree from the same institution in 1951.

In 1962, Governor Norman A. Erbe appointed Harris to a seat on the Iowa District Court, and in 1972, Governor Robert D. Ray elevated Harris to a seat on the state supreme court.

Personal life and death
In 1948, Harris married Madonna Coyne, with whom he had two daughters and a son. He died in Jefferson at the age of 82.

References

External links

2010 deaths
1927 births
People from Jefferson, Iowa
University of Iowa alumni
University of Iowa College of Law alumni
United States Army personnel of World War II
Justices of the Iowa Supreme Court